Storsjøen is a lake in the Odalen valley in Innlandet county, Norway. The  lake straddles the municipal boundary between Sør-Odal Municipality and Nord-Odal Municipality. The lake lies just south of the village of Sand (in Nord-Odal) and just north of the village of Skarnes (in Sør-Odal).

When the river Glomma reaches high water levels, the river begins to flow into the lake Storsjøen. This phenomenon has given rise to the very special delta area at the southern end of the lake. This delta area has been protected as the Seimsjøen nature reserve.

The sea is rich in fish and an important stopover for waders and swimming birds. The lake is a popular tourist destination for many tourists.

See also
List of lakes in Norway

References

Nord-Odal
Sør-Odal
Lakes of Innlandet